Paré is a family name of French origin. Some of the people who bear this name are:
 
 Ambroise Paré (c. 1510–1590), French surgeon
 Élise Paré-Tousignant (1937–2018), Canadian music administrator and pedagogue
 François Paré (born 1949), Quebecois author and academic
 Jean Paré (born 1927), Canadian cookbook author
 Jean Paré (journalist) (born 1935), Canadian journalist
 Jean-Guy Paré (born 1947), Canadian politician
 Jessica Paré (born 1980), Canadian actress
 Mark Paré (born 1957), Canadian NHL official
 Michael Paré (born 1958), American actor
 Pargui Emile Paré, Burkinabé politician
 Philippe Paré (born 1935), Canadian educator and politician
 Sammy Paré, fictional character in the Marvel Comics universe

See also
 Parè, municipality in the Province of Como
 Pare (disambiguation)